Carlo Ludovico Bragaglia (8 July 1894 – 4 January 1998) was an Italian film director whose career spanned from the 1930s to the mid-1960s. He mainly directed adventure pictures and popular comedies, including some starring Totò. His 1942 film Non ti pago! was shown as part of a retrospective on Italian comedy at the 67th Venice International Film Festival.

Biography

Bragaglia was born in  Frosinone, Latium, and was a veteran of World War I. He was wounded in action, and subsequently received a medal. Upon his discharge, Bragaglia and his brother Arturo began to experiment with photography. He later connected with Anton Giulio, another brother, to found the Casa d'arte Bragaglio. The establishment quickly became a popular attraction for Rome artists. Bragaglio then founded an independent  theater and launched his theatrical career. As with his earlier photography, he was primarily interested in the avant-garde. Bragaglia's father was the technical head of Cines Studios and in 1930, Bragaglia joined him and began learning the basics of filmmaking.

Bragaglia made his directorial debut with a few documentaries, and his first film proper was released in 1933. Entitled O la Borsa o la Vita, the picture was comedic in nature and his next few films would follow this mold.

Upon his 100th birthday in 1994, the Locarno Film Festival showed a film retrospective of his works. Being that he lived well into his second century Bragaglia became known as a famed storyteller who provided a wealth of information and anecdotes concerning the early days of Italian cinema. He died in Rome in 1998 after a fall which fractured his hip.

Filmography

Lowered Sails (1931)
Your Money or Your Life (1932)
Non son gelosa (1933)
Bad Subject (1933)
Quella vecchia canaglia (1934)
 Unripe Fruit (1934)
Amore (1936)
 Tomb of the Angels (1937)
Belle o brutte si sposan tutte... (1939)
Mad Animals (1939)
L'amore si fa così (1939)
Un mare di guai (1939)
 Two on a Vacation (1940)
Alessandro, sei grande! (1940)
Una famiglia impossibile (1941)
La forza bruta (1941)
 The Prisoner of Santa Cruz (1941)
Barbablù (1941)
 The Happy Ghost (1941)
Due cuori sotto sequestro (1941)
La scuola dei timidi (1941)
Se io fossi onesto (1942)
Violette nei capelli (1942)
La guardia del corpo (1942)
Non ti pago! (1942)
After Casanova's Fashion (1942)
 Music on the Run (1943)
La vita è bella (1943)
Non sono superstizioso... ma! (1943)
Il fidanzato di mia moglie (1943)
Tutta la vita in ventiquattr'ore (1943)
Torna a Sorrento (1945)
My Widow and I (1945)
Hotel Luna, Room 34 (1946)
Pronto chi parla? (1946)
 The White Primrose (1947)
L'altra (1947)
Totò Le Mokò (1949)
Il falco rosso (1949)
 Toto Looks for a Wife (1950)
Bluebeard's Six Wives (1950)
 Figaro Here, Figaro There (1950)
47 morto che parla (1950)
Una bruna indiavolata! (1951)
The Secret of Three Points (1952)
 I'm the Hero (1952)
Don Lorenzo (1952)
At Sword's Edge (1952)
 Orient Express (1954)
Il falco d'oro (1955)
Queen of Babylon (1955)
Lazzarella (1957)
Io, mammeta e tu (1958)
Tuppe tuppe, Marescià! (1958)
Caporale di giornata (1958)
The Mighty Crusaders (1958)
The Sword and the Cross (1958)
Le cameriere (1959)
Hannibal (1959)
The Loves of Hercules (1960)
Amazons of Rome (1961)
Ursus in the Valley of the Lions (1961)
Pastasciutta nel deserto (1961)
I 4 monaci (1962)
The Four Musketeers (1963)

References

External links

1894 births
1998 deaths
People from Frosinone
Italian film directors
Italian male screenwriters
Italian centenarians
Men centenarians
Italian military personnel of World War I
David di Donatello Career Award winners
20th-century Italian screenwriters
20th-century Italian male writers